Cin, CIn or CIN may refer to:

Science and technology

Medicine
 Cervical intraepithelial neoplasia, the abnormal growth of cells on the surface of the cervix that could potentially lead to cervical cancer.
 Chromosome instability, a type of genomic instability
 Contrast-induced nephropathy, a form of kidney damage caused by exposure to medical imaging contrast material

Computing
 An object of the C++ Iostream header file (C-In).
.cin, Cineon file format

Other sciences
 Convective inhibition, the amount of energy required to overcome the negatively buoyant energy the environment exerts on an air parcel
 Cosine integral, of which the standard mathematical symbol is "Cin"
 Chemical formula of Cyanogen iodide

Organizations
 Werner Reichardt Centre for Integrative Neuroscience 
 The ICAO-code of Constellation Airlines, a defunct Belgian airline
 Corporação Industrial do Norte, Portuguese-owned company that is the Iberian market leader for paint & coating products 
 Chart Information Network, now known as the Official Charts Company
 Children in Need, an annual UK Telethon Fundraiser shown on the BBC
 The Crime & Investigation Network
 The Caribbean International Network (CIN TV)

Places
 Cincinnati, Ohio
 The Cincinnati Reds, the city's Major League Baseball team
 The Cincinnati Bengals, the city's National Football League team
 The Amtrak code for Cincinnati Union Terminal

People
 Kadir Cin, Turkish volleyball player

Other uses
Critical Information Needs, information that people need to live safe and healthy lives.

 
 Craft Identification Number, a fourteen-digit identifier used for European marine vessels
Card Identification Number
 Chibi North railway station, China Railway telegraph code CIN

See also
 Qin (disambiguation), sometimes spelled "Cin"

eo:CIN